List of squares in Zagreb lists all squares in the City of Zagreb.
 Barčev trg
 Britanski trg
 Cvjetni trg (Trg Petra Preradovića)Cvjetni trg
 Dječji trg
 Dubravkin trg
 Horvaćanski trg (settlement Horvati)
 Ilički trg
 Ilirski trg
 Istarski trg
 Jezuitski trg
 Kninski trg
 Naserov trg
 Nehruov trg
 Opatijski trg
 Podsusedski trg
 Šestinski trg
 Trešnjevački trg
 Trg 101. brigade Hrvatske vojske Susedgrad
 Trg 145. brigade Hrvatske vojske Dubrava
 Trg Ane Rukavine
 Trg Ante Starčevića
 Trg Antuna Mihanovića
 Trg Antuna, Ivana i Vladimira Mažuranića
 Trg Augustina Kažotića
 Trg bana Josipa Jelačića
 Trg botinečkih branitelja
 Trg Braće hrvatskoga zmaja
 Trg dr. Eugena Kvaternika
 Trg dr. Franje Tuđmana
 Trg dr. Vladka Mačeka
 Trg Drage Iblera
 Trg Dragutina Domjanića (Sesvete)
 Trg Dražena Petrovića
 Trg Europe
 Trg Francuske Republike
 Trg Franklina Roosvelta
 Trg Franje Markovića
 Trg grada Passignano sul Trasimeno
 Trg hrvatskih branitelja Domovinskog rata (settlement Hrvatski Leskovac)
 Trg Hrvatskih obrambenih snaga
 Trg hrvatskih Pavlina
 Trg hrvatskih velikana
 Trg Ivana Kukuljevića Sakcinskog
 Trg Ivana Meštrovića
 Trg Johna Fitzgeralda Kennedyja
 Trg Josipa Jurja Strossmayera
 Trg Josipa Jurja Strossmayera (settlement Popovec)
 Trg Josipa Langa
 Trg Jurja Muliha (settlement Hrašće Turopoljsko)
 Trg kardinala Franje Šepera
 Trg Katarine Zrinske
 Trg kralja Petra Krešimira IV.
 Trg kralja Tomislava
 Trg kralja Tomislava (Sesvete)
 Trg Lovre Matačića (Sesvete)
 Trg Luke Botića
 Trg Marka Marulića
 Trg Republike Hrvatske
 Trg Milovana Zoričića
 Trg Narodne zaštite
 Trg Nevenke Topalušić
 Trg Nikole Šubića Zrinskog
 Trg Nikole Tesle (Sesvete)
 Trg Otokara Keršovanija
 Trg Palih Boraca (settlement Blaguša)
 Trg Palih Boraca (settlement Jesenovec)
 Trg Petra Petretića
 Trg Petra Preradovića 
 Trg Petra Svačića
 Trg Republike Hrvatske
 Trg Senjskih Uskoka
 Trg Siječanjskih žrtava 1945.
 Trg Slavoljuba Penkale
 Trg sportova
 Trg Stenjevec
 Trg Stjepana Konzula
 Trg Stjepana Radića
 Trg svete Klare
 Trg svete Marije Čučerske
 Trg Svetog Križa
 Trg svetog Marka
 Trg svetog Šimuna
 Trg Svetog Trojstva (settlement Moravče)
 Trg Svibanjskih žrtava 1995.
 Trg Vlaha Bukovca
 Trg Volovčica
 Trg žrtava fašizma 
 Trg žrtava fašizma (settlement Glavnica Donja)
 Zeleni trg

External links
 

Zagreb-related lists